Edmund Dummer (1663–1724) was an English lawyer who was appointed "Clerk of the Great Wardrobe" under Queen Anne in 1706, holding that office until 1721. 

His nephew, Thomas Lee Dummer, succeeded him as "Clerk of the Great Wardrobe" and became MP for Southampton (1737–1741) and (Newport (Isle of Wight) (1765–1768).

There is a memorial to Dummer in South Stoneham church. He is thought to have commissioned South Stoneham House, the grounds of which were designed by Capability Brown.

References

External links
The Family of Dummer of British Origin
 

1663 births
1724 deaths
English lawyers
People from the Borough of Eastleigh